SC 129 can refer to:

 South Carolina Highway 129, a state highway in the United States
 Convoy SC 129, a naval formation and engagement during the Second World War